Paweł Mariusz Rowiński (born 26 February 1965) is a Polish hydrogeologist, hydrodynamicist, geophysicist, full professor at the  Institute of Geophysics, Polish Academy of Sciences, a full member of the Polish Academy of Sciences, Vice-President of the Polish Academy of Sciences (2015–2018 and 2019–2022).

He specializes in environmental hydrodynamics, river physics, mathematical modelling and experimental studies of hydrological and hydrophysical processes. Rowiński's main scientific achievements are related to the analysis of mechanisms of turbulent mass and energy transport in flowing water. He has also written a number of works on statistical methods in hydrology, intelligent data analysis, and the consequences of climate change.

Education and professional activity 

In 1988 he graduated from the Faculty of Mathematics, Informatics and Mechatronics at the Warsaw University of Technology. In 1995 he earned his PhD, followed in 2002 by his higher doctorate (DSc, doktora habilitowanego). Both his PhD and DSc dissertations received awards from the Polish Prime Minister. In 2009 he received the title of full professor of Earth  sciences from the President of Poland. In 2010 he was elected a corresponding member of the Polish Academy of Sciences, and in 2022 became a full member of the Academy.

In 1991 he held scholarships from the Deutsche Forschungsgemeinschaft at the Institut für Geographie und Geoökologie in Berlin, the Stefan Batory Foundation at the Central European University in Budapest, and next at the State University of New York (1991-1992).  In 1993 he received the Stony Brook Foundation Individual Grant, in 1994 a scholarship from the Foundation for Polish Science. W 2000 he was a post-doc researcher at the National Center for Ecological Analysis and Synthesis, Santa Barbara, California.

He has held many functions within the structures of the Polish Academy of Sciences. Director (2008-2015) of the Institute of Geophysics, Polish Academy of Sciences  and previously (2005-2008) Deputy Director for Scientific Affairs of the Institute of Geophysics, Polish Academy of Sciences. Member of the Board of Directors of the Scientific Units of the Polish Academy of Sciences (2011-2015). He was also a co-founder and the first chairman of the Earth and Planets Research Centre GeoPlanet PAS (2009-2015), bringing together five PAS institutes. In 2012-2015 he served as Vice-Chairman of the Board of Curators of Faculty III of the Polish Academy of Sciences (PAS) in the exact sciences and earth sciences, from January to May 2015 he held the position of Chairman of the Board of Curators of Faculty III of PAS. In 2015 he was elected Vice President of the Polish Academy of Sciences. In 2018, he was elected Vice President for a second term (2019-2022).

He is involved in activities for the development of the Polish Academy of Sciences, including those of a strategic nature. He chairs the team working on the assumptions for the project and draft amendments to the Act on the Polish Academy of Sciences and, earlier, the team working on the regulations for electing members of the Academy. He is also Chairman of the Scholarship Committee of PAN and of the Advisory Board to the PAS President for the budget allocation of the Academy. He was the initiator of the creation of the Office of Scientific Excellence at the Academy, supporting Polish applications in the European Research Council ERC competitions, and is currently the coordinator (he was also the originator) of the PASIFIC scholarship programme (2019-2024), funded by the European Commission under the Maria Skłodowska-Curie COFUND Programme (a project with a total budget of nearly 50 million PLN). The programme aims to promote innovative research ideas in PAN units. Rowiński's initiatives also include the establishment and currently coordination of the work of the Advisory Team to the President of the Polish Academy of Sciences on the climate crisis, which regularly prepares and disseminates communications concerning many aspects of the impact of climate change on the social and economic life of Poland.

He sits on the scientific councils of numerous scientific institutes: the PAS Institute of Geophysics (since 2004), the PAS Institute of Oceanology (2011-2014, 2015-2018), the PAS Nicolaus Copernicus Astronomical Centre (2015-2018), the PAS Institute of Geological Sciences  (2015-2018). Rowinski is also actively involved in the work of several PAS committees: the Council for the Dissemination of Science of the Polish Academy of Sciences (2008), the Committee for Research on Water-Related Hazards of the Polish Academy of Sciences (2011-2014), the Committee for Water Management of the Polish Academy of Sciences (2011-2014, from 2020), the Committee for Geophysics of the Polish Academy of Sciences (from 2007). He was also a member of scientific councils at the Polish Geological Institute—National Research Institute (2008-2015) and at the Institute of Physical Geography of the University of Warsaw (2005-2008, 2012-2016). From 2014 to 2016 he was a member of the board of the National Scientific Leading Centre for Polar Studies and a member of the Polar Task Force at the Ministry of Foreign Affairs. He was the chair of the Interdisciplinary Team for Cooperation with Foreign Countries at the Ministry of Science and Higher Education (2011-2015).

He has authored over one hundred and seventy scientific publications, and co-authored or co-edited of fifteen books and five special issues of international scientific journals. A member of numerous Polish and international scientific committees and organisations, including the International Association for Hydro-Environment Engineering and Research (IAHR) -- where he has held the position of Chairman of the Board of the European branch since September 2022; ALLEA, the European Federation of Academies of Sciences and Humanities – member of the Board for three consecutive terms (2018-2024); the Polish Committee of the UNESCO Hydrological Programme - UNESCO IHP National Committee – the 2019-2022 term of office; in 2021 elected member of the board of Science Advice for Policy by European Academies, SAPEA, which brings together more than one hundred European academies and scientific societies.

He is the creator and chief editor of a book series published by Springer: Geoplanet: Earth and Planetary Sciences, which has so far produced more than 40 titles. He has been or is a member of many editorial boards, including for the journals SpringerBriefs in Earth Sciences, Water, Publications of the Institute of Geophysics Series, Hydrological Sciences Journal, currently the Archives of Hydro-Engineering and Environmental Mechanics, Ecohydrology & Hydrobiology; chairman of the ethics committee for the Springer journal Acta Geophysica.  

As a measure of Rowinski's recognition and international standing in the hydrological community, the International Association for Hydro-Environment Engineering and Research (IAHR) entrusted him with the organisation of the 6th IAHR Europe Congress "No frames, no borders" (500 participants from 52 countries), which took place in February 2021.

Organiser of the annual World Water Day celebrations, under the patronage of UNESCO from 2020.

He has supervised numerous diploma theses, including five PhDs.

Rowiński is internationally recognised by the scientific community, especially in the field of the dynamically developing new speciality of environmental hydrodynamics. He conducts theoretical research, constructs mathematical models, carries out computational work as well as complex experimental research both in laboratories and in natural conditions (in rivers). In recent years, his research has focused particularly on several issues:

 Pioneering work on flow structure, including turbulence structure in rivers with complex geometry and in the presence of vegetation - experimental studies in laboratories and rivers; also theoretical work,
 Unique field studies, so-called tracer studies and the construction of mathematical models of heat, oxygen and pollutant transport in rivers, analysing the mixing processes of pollutants in rivers and the impact of water-air exchange - practical decision-making tools for water protection in case of accidents, toxic inflows and environmental disasters,
 In the framework of research on river metabolism, demonstration of, among other things, cyclic changes in river oxygenation at different time scales, depending on channel morphology, hydrological and meteorological factors,
 Development of a novel method for the determination of bottom stresses generated by flow resistance; also for the transport of river debris under transient motion conditions,
 Development of advanced methods based on new optimization procedures (the black hole optimization approach; swarm intelligence…), evolutionary algorithms, neural networks,
 Uncertainty analysis of models (and experimental studies) of transport processes in rivers, including heat transport
 Nature Based Solutions,
 Studies on the motion of single grains in turbulent flows, initiated already in the doctoral dissertation - improvement of Lagrangian models of particulate matter motion in river flows brought about a significant improvement in the possibilities to describe debris motion.

Science communication efforts 
He is involved in various activities popularising science, gives lectures and maintains a media presence, speaking out on issues concerning the organization of science, the climate crisis and water problems. Appointed as Honorary Chairman of the Committee Science Picnic of the Copernicus Science Centre and Polish Radio, 2022. Jury member for the mBank Foundation's "Step into the Future" Competition for the best master's thesis in mathematics. He has lectured in two degree programs: MBA Energy and Climate Policy Management and Climate and Environment Competency Studies at the Paweł Adamowicz Civic Studies. Commentator for Poland's Center for Eastern Studies (OSW) for a report on "Drought in the Czech Republic: Political, economic and social consequences" and a lecture on drought in Europe. He is a member of the Council for the Promotion of Science, Polish Academy of Sciences (since 2011). He has given a number of plenary and invited lectures at various scientific institutions (e.g. lectures during the inauguration of the academic year at SGGW (2020), at the Faculty of Oceanography and Geography of the University of Gdansk (2018), at Climate Change, Health of the Planet and Future of Humanity (2018) - Casina Pio IV, Pontifical Academy of Sciences Vatican City, 5th Workshop on River and Sedimentation Hydrodynamics and Morphodynamics in Porto, at the International Symposium on Ecohydrology for the Circular Economy and Nature-Based Solutions towards mitigation/adaptation to Climate Change, at University College London, University of Padua, University of Versailles Saint-Quentin-en-Yvelines and others. He frequently speaks out on the future of education.

Selected media appearances 

 Publications in Academia, the bilingual quarterly magazine of the Polish Academy of Sciences,
 Radio programs,
 Television programs,
 Appearing in a documentary on water, "Co z tą wodą" on Polish public broadcaster TVP1,
 Extensive interviews in the media, including.

Received awards from the Polish Prime Minister for both his doctoral (PhD) and postdoctoral (DSc) dissertation, held scholarships from the Foundation for Polish Science and the Stefan Batory Foundation. In 2015, he received the Bene Merito badge from the Polish Minister of Foreign Affairs in recognition of his merits in promoting and strengthening Poland's position in the international arena. In 2016, he received the Central European University's Alumni Impact Award (one of just two such distinguished alumni from Poland), in 2017, the Vietnam Academy Medal, and in 2019, the Medal of the Warsaw Agricultural University (SGGW).

Private life 
He is married to Agata Rowińska, with whom he has a daughter Paulina.

Selected publications 

 Articles

 
 
 
 

 Books

References

Polish geophysicists
Academic staff of the Polish Academy of Sciences
1965 births
Living people